Sinocrossocheilus guizhouensis is a species of cyprinid of the genus Sinocrossocheilus. It is considered harmless to humans and has not been evaluated on the IUCN Red List.

References

Cyprinid fish of Asia